Following is a list of notable Polish architects and architects from Poland ordered by architectural period.

Gothic

Renaissance and Mannerism

 Jakub Balin
 Bartolommeo Berrecci (Bartłomiej Berecci) (c. 1480–1537)
 Krzysztof Bonadura Starszy (1582–1670)
 Santi Gucci (c. 1530–1599)
 Jan Michałowicz (1530–1578)
 Bernardo Morando (c. 1540–1600)
 Giovanni Battista di Quadro (born 1590)
 Gabriel Słoński (1520–1598)
 Jan Strakowski (1567–1642)

Baroque

 Krzysztof Arciszewski (1592–1656)
 Kacper Bażanka (c. 1689–1726)
 Piotr Beber
 Jan Frankiewicz 
 Christof Marselis (1670s–1731)
 Bartłomiej Nataniel Wąsowski (1617–1687)
 Tylman van Gameren (1632–1706)
 Jan Zaor

18th century:  Post Baroque, Rococo and Classical

 Chrystian Piotr Aigner (1756–1841)
 Józef Boretti (1746–1849)
 Jakub Fontana (1710–1773)
 Paweł Giżycki (1692–1762)
 Jan Krzysztof Glaubitz (1700–1767)
 Faustyn Grodzicki
 Wawrzyniec Gucewicz (1753–1798)
 Jan Christian Kamsetzer (1753–1795)
 Józef Karsznicki 
 Marcin Knackfus (ca. 1742–ca. 1821) 
 Franciszek Koźmiński 
 Jakub Kubicki (1758–1833)
 Fryderyk Albert Lessel (1767–1822)
 Andrzej Melenski (1766–1833)
 Dominik Merlini (1730–1797)
 Józef Feliks Rogaliński
 Antoni Solari
 Bonawentura Solari
 Efraim Szreger (1727–1783)
 Stanisław Zawadzki (1743–1806)
 Szymon Bogumił Zug (1733–1807)
 Tomasz Żebrowski (18th century)

19th century:  Historicism and Eclecticism

 Julian Ankiewicz (1820–1903)
 Bronisław Brochwicz-Rogoyski (1861–1921)
 Franciszek Chełmiński (1862–1932)
 Edward Cichocki (1833–1899)
 Julian Cybulski
 Tomasz Bohdanowicz-Dworzecki (1859–1920)
 Józef Pius Dziekoński (1844–1927)
 Władysław Ekielski (1855–1927)
 Zygmunt Gorgolewski (1845–1903)
 Józef Gosławski (1865–1904)
 Stanisław Grochowicz
 Władysław Hirszel (1831–1889)
 Juliusz Hochberger
 Józef Huss (1846–1904)
 Józef Kajetan Janowski (1832–1914)
 Alfred Kamienobrodzki (1844–1922) 
 Karol Knaus
 Feliks Księżalski (1820–1884)
 Gustaw Landau-Gutenteger (1879–1917)
 Dawid Lande (1868–1928)
 Józef Grzegorz Lessel (1802–1844)
 Wiesław Lisowski (1884–1954)
 Antoni Łuszkiewicz (1838–1886)
 Michał Łużecki (1868 after 1939) 
 Hilary Majewski (1838–1892)
 Karol Majewski (1824–1897)
 Enrico Marconi (1792–1863)
 Władysław Marconi (1848–1915)
 Franciszek Miechowicz (1786–1852)
 Maciej Moraczewski (1840–1928)
 Michael Novosielski architect of the King's Theatre in London
 Sławomir Odrzywolski-Nałęcz (1846–1933)
 Józef Orłowski
 Tomasz Pajzderski (1864–1908)
 Józef Plośko
 Karol Podczaszyński (1790–1860)
 Bolesław Podczaszyński (1822–1876) son of Karol Podczaszyński
 Filip Pokutyński (1829–1879)
 Tomasz Pryliński (1847–1895)
 Władysław Sadłowski (1869–1940)
 Franciszek Skowron
 Roger Sławski (1871–1963)
 Józef Sosnowski
 Stefan Szyller (1857–1933)
 Aleksander Szymkiewicz
 Hipolit Śliwiński (1866–1932) 
 Leopold Śmieciński
 Teodor Talowski (1857–1910)
 Julian Zachariewicz (1837–1898)
 Jan Zawiejski (1854–1922)
 Adolf Zeligson
 Józef Sare (1850–1929)
 Karol Zaremba (1846–1897)
 Jan Sas Zubrzycki (1860–1935)
 Stefan Żołdani

20th century to present:  Modern

A–B

 Hanna Adamczewska-Wejchert (1920-1996)
 Stanisław Adamski (1875-1967)
 Roman Bandurski (1874–1949)
 Lotte Beese (1903-1988)
 Barbara Brukalska (1899-1980)
 Stefan Bryła (1886–1943)

C–D
 Adolf Ciborowski (1918–1987)
 Jan Cieśliński (1899–1967)
 Gerard Ciołek (1909-1966)
 Józef Czajkowski (1872-1947)
 Władysław Derdacki (1882–1951)

E–F

 Roman Feliński (1886-1953)
 Stanisław Fiszer (1769-1812)

G–I

 Henryk Julian Gay (Henryk Gaj) (1875–1936)
 Vladislav Gorodetsky (born Leszek Dezydery Władysław Horodecki)(1863–1930) 
 Jadwiga Grabowska-Hawrylak (1920–2018)
 Paweł Graliński (born 1961) 
 Stanisław Hempel (1892–1954)
 Jerzy Hryniewiecki (1909–1988)

J–K

 Stanisław Jankowski (1911-2002)
 Ryszard Jurkowski (born 1945)
 Ignacy Kędzierski (1877–1968) 
 Zygmunt Kędzierski (1839–1924)
 Jacek Krenz (born 1948)
 Bogdan Krzyżanowski
 Stefan Kuryłowicz (1949–2011)

L–M

 Bohdan Lachert (1900–1987)
 Zbigniew Brochwicz-Lewiński (1877–1951)
 Józef Masłowski (1931-2020)
 Franciszek Mączyński (1874–1947)
 Witold Minkiewicz (1880–1961) 
 Kazimierz Mokłowski (1869-1905)

N–O
 Maciej Nowicki (1910–1950)
 Tadeusz Obmiński (1874–1932)

P–Q
 Sylwester Pajzderski (1876–1953)
 Włodzimierz Podhorodecki (1859-1923)
 Juliusz Prandecki (1928-2016)
 Georg Przyrembel (1885–1956)
 Bohdan Pniewski (1897–1965)

R–S

 Wincenty Rawski (1850-1927)
 Stanisław Ryniak (1915–2004)
 Halina Skibniewska (1921-2011)
 Roger Sławski (1871–1963)
 Jerzy Sołtan (1913–2005)
 Oskar Sosnowski (1880-1939)
 Tadeusz Stryjeński (1849–1943) 
 Szymon Syrkus (1893–1964)
 Helena Syrkus (1900–1982)
 Józef Szanajca (1902-1939)
 Witold Szolginia (1923–1996)
 Adolf Szyszko-Bohusz (1883–1948)

T–U
 Czesław Thullie (1886–1976)
 Michał Ulam (1879–1938)
 Kazimierz Ulatowski (1884–1975)
 Tomasz Urbanowicz (born 1959)

V–Z
 Jan Koszczyc-Witkiewicz (1881–1958)
 Kazimierz Wyczyński (1876-1923)
 Wojciech Zabłocki (born 1930)
 Alfred Zachariewicz (1871-1937)
 Jan Zachwatowicz (1900–1983)
 Stanisław Żaryn (1913–1964), architect and monument conservator
 Zbigniew Zieliński (1907–1968)
 Wiktor Zin (1925–2007)
 Juliusz Żórawski (1898-1967)

See also

 Architecture of Poland
 List of architects
 List of Poles

References

Polish
Architects